It'll All Make Sense in the End is the fourth studio album by English singer-songwriter James Arthur, released on 5 November 2021 through Columbia Records. It was preceded by the singles "Medicine" and "September", and was initially set for release on 8 October.

Background and recording
After a period of self-reflection during the COVID-19 lockdowns in 2020, Arthur was inspired to begin work on new material and set up a home studio. Before beginning work, he knew he "wanted to make a record that was guitar-driven. [...] I knew that I wanted to make a coherent album, one that felt like a body of work that was all made in the same place." After working on several songs, he realised that he was writing about experiences that he had "never really addressed or spoken about before" and was motivated to complete a full body of work.

Arthur emphasised the difference in energy as compared to his previous work, calling his vocals "so intense on the record, and it made sense to match that intensity with heavy guitars and the trap drums". Although his label were initially unsure about the loudness of the guitars in the mix for an otherwise pop record, Arthur felt that when he had previously "dilute[d] the rock elements", he "lost" himself and wanted them to be more prominent on the album. The BBC also called it a "grittier, guitar-driven sound" as compared to Arthur's first three albums.

Arthur titled the record It'll All Make Sense in the End because "it's what I'd say to my younger self", which also inspired the cover art, which is meant to depict a "post-apocalyptic world where absolutely nothing makes sense".

Critical reception
i writer Kate Solomon rated the album two out of five stars, describing Arthur's voice as "still very strong with the same slight husk to it, but he is let down by forgettable music and frankly terrible lyrics", ultimately concluding that "[t]here is no passion in his voice and no drama in the music. It's all about as anonymous as a stranger walking past you in the street."

Track listing

Charts

References

2021 albums
Columbia Records albums
James Arthur albums
Albums produced by TMS (production team)